Ōmāio is a coastal township in the Ōpōtiki District and Bay of Plenty Region of New Zealand's North Island.

During the 20th century, families collectively farmed the area for sheep and beef. More recently, they have been considering a shift to kiwifruit farming. Funding was granted for a pilot kiwifruit farm in April 2017.

During 2018 and 2019, National Institute of Water and Atmospheric Research tested climate-resilient crops in Ōmāio. Due to the impact of climate change, Ōmāio has had fewer frosts, shorter winters, drier summers, more extreme weather, and greater pressure on its water supplies.

In June 2019, Ōmāio hosted an historic signing of a Treaty of Waitangi settlement agreement between Te Whānau-ā-Apanui and the Crown.

Marae

The settlement has three marae of Te Whānau-ā-Apanui.

Ōmāio Marae and Rongomaihuatahi meeting house is a meeting place for the hapū of Te Whānau a Nuku. In October 2020, the Government committed $1,646,820 from the Provincial Growth Fund to upgrade the marae and five others, creating 10 jobs.

Ōtūwhare Marae and Te Poho o Rūtāia meeting house belongs to the hapū of Te Whānau a Rutaia.

Whitianga Marae and Tūtawake meeting house belongs to the hapū of Te Whānau a Tutawake.

Education

It was established in January 2016, through the merger of Raukokore School, Te Kura o Ōmāio and Te Whānau-a-Apanui Area School.

Rugby player Ruahei Demant lived in Ōmāio until the age of 12. She described the township as a "tiny place" in "the wops".

References

Ōpōtiki District
Populated places in the Bay of Plenty Region